Larisa Alaverdyan (born 21 September 1943), is an Armenian pedagogue and politician who served as the first Human Rights Defender of Armenia (Ombudsman), member of the National Assembly between 2007 and 2012 and leader of the faction of party Founding Parliament between 2009 and 2012.

Biography
Alaverdyan was born in Baku, nowadays part of Republic of Azerbaijan and After graduating from the State Pedagogical Institute of Azerbaijan in 1966, she started her pedagogical work as a teacher of mathematics and drawing. Between 1966 and 1967 was teacher of maths in a  rural secondary school.

From 1991 to 1995, was the chief expert of the Special Commission of the Supreme Council of Armenia in issues related to Nagorno-Karabakh, and since 2006 is the executive director of the NGO "Against the Violation of Law".

She is actually the director of Institute of Law and Politics of the Russian-Armenian University, where teaches since 2002.

Participated in the European Union-Armenia parliamentary cooperative committee in the 10th meeting between 24 and 26 November 2008.

Career as Ombudsman
The office of Human Rights Defender, or Ombudsman, of Armenia was created by law in October 2003, and on 19 February 2004 Larisa Alaverdyan was appointed to the office by presidential decree, assuming the office on 1 March 2004.

She helped the creation of the rehabilitation center of the South Caucasus for the victims of organized violence. This center managed to bring back home some Armenian children( 1992 to 1996).

References

1943 births
Living people
Ombudsmen in Armenia
21st-century Armenian women politicians
21st-century Armenian politicians
Politicians from Baku
Soviet Armenians
Members of the National Assembly (Armenia)
20th-century Armenian women politicians
20th-century Armenian politicians
Armenian human rights activists